All Saints railway station served the town of Clevedon, North Somerset, England, from 1917 to 1940 on the Weston, Clevedon and Portishead Railway.

History 
The station opened in October 1917 by the Weston, Clevedon and Portishead Railway. It had a level crossing with four gates, which were operated by the local blacksmith. The station closed on 20 May 1940. The site is now a footpath.

References

External links 

Disused railway stations in Somerset
Railway stations in Great Britain opened in 1917
Railway stations in Great Britain closed in 1940
1917 establishments in England
1940 disestablishments in England